Resveratroloside is a stilbenoid glucoside. It can be found in Paeonia lactiflora.

References

External links 
 Resveratroloside at kanaya.naist.jp

Resveratrol glycosides
Phenol glucosides